Hashuqua Creek is a stream in the U.S. state of Mississippi. It is a tributary to the Noxubee River.

Hashuqua is a name derived from the Choctaw language, purportedly meaning "grass grows". A variant name is "Hashhooker Creek" and "Hashugua Creek".

References

Rivers of Mississippi
Rivers of Noxubee County, Mississippi
Rivers of Winston County, Mississippi
Mississippi placenames of Native American origin